Cihan Haspolatlı (born 4 January 1980) is a former Turkish football player in midfield and right back positions.

Club career
He played for Kocaelispor and Galatasaray. He was a key player while playing at Galatasaray, but was later on criticized by many supporters. Following the critics and his poor performance, he was sold to Bursaspor, then transferred to Konyaspor in 2008 and Ankaragücü in 2009.

International career
Cihan was a part of the Turkish National team during the buildup to the 2002 World Cup Squad in Korea/Japan but missed out on selection to the final squad for the tournament.

Honours 
 Kocaelispor
Turkish Cup (1): 2002
 Galatasaray
Süper Lig (1): 2005-06
Turkish Cup (1): 2005

Career statistics

International goals
Scores and results list. Turkey's goal tally first.

External links
 
 

1980 births
Living people
Sportspeople from Diyarbakır
Turkish footballers
Turkey international footballers
Turkey B international footballers
Kocaelispor footballers
Galatasaray S.K. footballers
Bursaspor footballers
Konyaspor footballers
MKE Ankaragücü footballers
İstanbul Başakşehir F.K. players
Süper Lig players
Association football midfielders
Association football defenders